The 1982 Merlion Cup is the inaugural edition of the invitational football tournament. Matches were held at the former Singapore National Stadium held from 5–17 October 1982.

Group stage

Group A

Group B

Final round

Semifinals

Third place play-off

Final

Awards

References

1982 in Singaporean football